Mastigolina bequaerti is a species of tephritid or fruit flies in the genus Mastigolina of the family Tephritidae.

Distribution
Sierra Leone, Liberia.

References

Tephritinae
Insects described in 1934
Diptera of Africa